Best Ex is a solo alternative project formed in 2017 by former Candy Hearts vocalist and songwriter, Mariel Loveland. Best Ex was named one of NJ.com's 32 artists to watch in 2022.

History 

With Loveland at the helm, Best Ex initially began as an offshoot of Candy Hearts. In 2017, the band hired The Kickdrums as a producer, announced the project, and released their debut EP, Ice Cream Anti-Social, on Alcopop Records. During the release, they embarked on a co-headlining tour of the U.S. with Shane Henderson of Valencia, adding touring member Matthew Florio.

Ice Cream Anti-Social received coverage from publications like DIY (magazine) and Alternative Press (magazine), who called the band's poppier sound "Loveland’s perfect fit." The summer after the release, Best Ex performed on the final run of Warped Tour, where Mariel opened up to The New York Times about experiencing abuse within the music industry. She said, "Instead of my team and the people who worked for me being like 'We’ll do what we can to make you feel safe' ... it was 'Why did you open your mouth?'"

When Loveland returned home, she struggled to adjust to life off the road, penning an essay in Billboard about her experience. She ultimately enlisted Andy Tongren of Young Rising Sons as a producer and recorded what would become Good At Feeling Bad in his kitchen. Loveland later explained her decision to distance herself from the pop punk genre, relaunching Best Ex with heavy electronic and pop influences and signing to No Sleep Records.

In May 2020, amidst on-and-off coronavirus lockdowns, Best Ex released Good At Feeling Bad.  Earmilk described the single as a "gorgeous contrast of melancholic lyrics against a pounding club beat." Loveland promoted the release in a virtual concert tribute to Joey Ramone with We Are Scientists and The Futureheads

In 2022, it was announced on social media that Best Ex had signed to Iodine Recordings and planned to release an LP in 2023. The Fest also announced that Best Ex were on the official lineup for Fest 20.

Discography

EPs 
Ice Cream Anti-Social (2017)
Good At Feeling Bad (2020)

References 

Indie pop groups from New Jersey
Singer-songwriters from New Jersey
American indie rock groups
Alcopop! Records artists